Édouard François André (1833–1894) was a French banker, politician, soldier and art collector. He was the husband of Nélie Jacquemart-André, the society painter. Their art collection is preserved at the Musée Jacquemart-André in Paris.

Biography
Son to Ernest André (1803–1864), Edouard André was born into a family of rich banker Protestants, native to the Southeast of France (Nîmes dans le Gard), who flourished during the Second French Empire. Edouard André lost his mother at the age of two.

In firm support of Napoleon III and sensitive to the Saint-Simonian ideas, the Andre family was involved in financing the modernization of France and large companies of the imperial regime.

He succeeded his father as MP of Gard, as such he was elected at 29 May 1864. He was re-elected at the 1869 French legislative election; he served until 4 September 1870, when the Third Republic was established.

After the fall of the Second Empire, he joined the National Guard in 1871. With the Rothschilds, he negotiated the contribution that France had to pay to Germany after the surrender and brought the necessary amount together in a short time.
Disappointed by politics, he decided to devote himself exclusively to his collections of paintings, furniture and art objects. In 1868, he sought the architect Henri Parent to design mansion of grand proportions on a plot of 5,700 m2 in Paris for 1.5 million francs.

References

French art collectors
Art collectors from Paris
French bankers
French politicians
French Protestants
1833 births
1894 deaths